The chair of the Professor of Botany at the University of Cambridge was founded by the university in 1724. In 2009 the chair was renamed the Regius Professor of Botany.

Professors of Botany
 Richard Bradley (1724)
 John Martyn (1733)
 Thomas Martyn (1762)
 John Stevens Henslow (1825)
 Cardale Babington (1861)
 Harry Marshall Ward (1895)
 Albert Seward (1906)
 Frederick Tom Brooks (1936)
 George Edward Briggs (1948)
 Harry Godwin (1960)
 Percy Wragg Brian (1968)
 Richard Gilbert West (1977)
 Thomas ap Rees (1991)
 Roger Allen Leigh (1998)
 Sir David Baulcombe (2007)

Regius Professors
 Sir David Baulcombe (2009)
 Dame Ottoline Leyser (2020)

References

Botany, Regius
Department of Plant Sciences, University of Cambridge
1724 establishments in England
Botany, Regius, Cambridge
Botany, Cambridge